Rulli is a village in Tõrva Parish, Valga County, in southern Estonia. It has a population of 33 (as of 1 January 2016).

References

Villages in Valga County